Plesiozela nielseni is a moth of the Heliozelidae family. It was described by Ole Karsholt and Niels P. Kristensen in 2003. It is found in Argentina.

References

Moths described in 2003
Heliozelidae